Mabel Lake Airport,  is located adjacent to Mabel Lake, British Columbia, Canada.

References

Registered aerodromes in British Columbia
Monashee Mountains